Yere Karekal Thippana Gowda (born 27 November 1971) is an Indian former cricketer who played for Karnataka and Railways domestically. He is primarily a right-handed batsman. He made his debut for Karnataka in 1994. A year later he later moved to Railways and won 2 Ranji, 3 Irani with them. He also won Duleep Trophy playing for Central Zone. In 2006-07 he returned to Karnataka to captain them and was also barred by BCCI for the 1st match for failing to inform about coming to his home team  He again move back to Railways to play till 2011 for them. He was one of the few Indian cricketers to play 100 Ranji matches. Javagal Srinath called him Rahul Dravid of Railways However, despite his success at domestic level, he was never selected for the Indian national team.

References

External links

1971 births
Railways cricketers
Karnataka cricketers
Central Zone cricketers
Indian cricketers
Living people
People from Raichur
Cricketers from Karnataka